{{DISPLAYTITLE:C5H8N2O3}}
The molecular formula C5H8N2O3 (molar mass: 144.13 g/mol, exact mass: 144.0535 u) may refer to:

 Dimethylol ethylene urea
 Nitrosoproline